A final good or consumer good is a final product ready for sale that is used by the consumer to satisfy current wants or needs, unlike a intermediate good, which is used to produce other goods. A microwave oven or a bicycle is a final good, but the parts purchased to manufacture them are intermediate goods.

When used in measures of national income and output, the term "final goods" includes only new goods. For example, gross domestic product (GDP) excludes items counted in an earlier year to prevent double counting based on resale of items. In that context, the economic definition of goods also includes what are commonly known as services.

Manufactured goods are goods that have been processed in any way. They are distinct from raw materials but include both intermediate goods and final goods.

Law 
There are legal definitions. For example, the United States' Consumer Product Safety Act has an extensive definition of consumer product, which begins:CONSUMER PRODUCT.--The term ‘‘consumer product’’ means any article, or component part thereof, produced or distributed (i) for sale to a consumer for use in or around a permanent or temporary household or residence, a school, in recreation, or otherwise, or (ii) for the personal use, consumption or enjoyment of a consumer in or around a permanent or temporary household or residence, a school, in recreation, or otherwise; but such term does not include—
(A) any article which is not customarily produced or distributed for sale to, or use or consumption by, or enjoyment of, a consumer,

It then goes on to list eight additional specific exclusions and further details.

Durability 
Final goods can be classified into the following categories:
Durable goods
Nondurable goods
Services

Consumer durable goods usually have a significant lifespan, which tends to be at least one year, based on the guarantee or warranty period. The maximum life depends upon the durability of the product or goods. Examples include tools, cars, and boats. On the other hand, capital goods, which are tangible in nature, such as machinery or building or any other equipment that can be used in manufacturing of final product, are durable goods with limited lifespans that are determined by manufacturers before their sale. The longevity and the often-higher cost of durable goods usually cause consumers to postpone expenditures on them, which makes durables the most volatile (or cost-dependent) component of consumption.

Consumer nondurable goods are purchased for immediate use or for use very soon. Generally, the lifespan of nondurable goods is from a few minutes to up to three years: food, beverages, clothing, shoes and gasoline are examples. In everyday language, nondurable goods get consumed or "used up".

Consumer services are intangible in nature. They cannot be seen, felt or tasted by the consumer but still give satisfaction to the consumer. They are also inseparable and variable in nature: they are thus produced and consumed simultaneously. Examples are haircuts, medical treatments, auto repairs and landscaping.

Buying habits 
Final goods can be classified into the following categories, which are determined by consumers' buying habits:
Convenience goods 
Shopping goods
Specialty goods 
Unsought goods

Convenience goods, shopping goods, and specialty goods are also known as "red goods", "yellow goods", and "orange goods", respectively, under the yellow, red and orange goods classification system.

Convenience goods 
Convenience goods are regularly consumed and easily available. Generally, convenience goods come in the category of nondurable goods such as fast foods, cigarettes and tobacco with low value. Convenience goods are sold mostly by wholesalers or retailers to make them available to the consumers in goods or large volume. Convenience goods can further be divided into staple convenience consumer goods and impulse convenience consumer goods.

Staple convenience consumer goods are the basic necessities of the consumer. These goods are easily available and in large quantity: milk, bread, sugar, etc.

Impulse convenience consumer goods do not belong to the priority list of the consumer. They are purchased without any prior planning, just on the basis of the impulse: potato wafers, candies, ice creams, cold drinks, etc.

Shopping consumer goods 

Shopping consumer goods are the goods which take lot of time and proper planning before making purchase decision; in this case consumer does a lot of selection and comparison based on various parameters such as cost, brand, style, comfort etc., before buying an item. Shopping goods are costlier than convenience goods and are durable in nature. Consumer goods companies usually try to set up their shops and show rooms in active shopping areas to attract customer attention and their main focus is to do much advertising and promotion to attract more customers.

Examples include clothing items, televisions, radios, footwear, home furnishings, etc.

Specialty consumer goods 

Specialty goods are unique in nature; these are unusual and luxurious items available in the market. Specialty goods are mostly purchased by the upper classes of society as they are expensive in nature and difficult to afford for the middle and lower classes. Companies advertise their goods targeting the upper class. These goods do not fall under the category of necessity; rather they are purchased on the basis personal preference or desire. Brand name, uniqueness, and special features of an item are major attributes which attract customers and make them buy such products.

Examples include antiques, jewelry, wedding dresses, cars, etc.

Unsought consumer goods 

Unsought goods belong to neither the necessity group of consumer goods list nor to specialty goods. They are always available in the market but are purchased by very few consumers, either based on their interest or their need for some specific reasons. The general public does not purchase such goods often.

Examples include snowshoes, fire extinguishers, flood insurance, etc.

Mergers and acquisitions 

In the consumer product sector, there have been 107,891 deals announced between 1985 and 2018, which cumulates to a total value of around US$5,835 billion. 2007 was the year with the largest value (US$4,888 billion) followed by a steep slump in 2009 (-70.9%). After the first wave in 2007, now is the second big M&A wave in the consumer products sector, and a decline is expected.

See also 
 Back-story (production)
 Fast-moving consumer goods
 Product/process distinction

References 

Goods (economics)
Manufactured goods